Sergey Ivanovich Kuznetsov (born 1 June 1960) is a former Russian professional footballer.

Club career
He made his professional debut in the Soviet First League in 1979 for FC Dynamo Leningrad. He played two games in the 1987–88 UEFA Cup with FC Zenit Leningrad.

Honours
 Soviet Top League champion: 1984.

References

1960 births
Footballers from Saint Petersburg
Living people
Soviet footballers
Russian footballers
Soviet Top League players
Russian Premier League players
Russian expatriate footballers
Expatriate footballers in Finland
Expatriate footballers in Estonia
Expatriate footballers in Kazakhstan
FC Dynamo Moscow players
FC Zenit Saint Petersburg players
FC Guria Lanchkhuti players
FC Lokomotiv Nizhny Novgorod players
FC Asmaral Moscow players
Russian expatriate sportspeople in Kazakhstan
Association football defenders
Turun Toverit players
FC Dynamo Saint Petersburg players